

1950s

1953-1954 Saturday afternoon Game of the Week period
Buddy Blattner 
Dizzy Dean
Gene Kirby

1959 National League tie-breaker series
George Kell
Bob DeLaney

1960s

1960 Saturday afternoon Game of the Week period
Jack Buck 
Carl Erskine

1965 Saturday afternoon Game of the Week period
Ken Coleman
Leo Durocher
Carl Erskine
Merle Harmon 
Tommy Henrich 
Keith Jackson
Jackie Robinson 
Chris Schenkel 
Warren Spahn
Bob Wolff

1976-1989 Monday/Thursday Night Baseball period 
Gary Bender (1987–1988)
Lou Brock (1980)
Norm Cash (1976)
Howard Cosell (1976–1985)
Don Drysdale (1978–1986)
Bob Gibson (1976–1978)
Keith Jackson (1976–1982; 1986)
Jim Lampley (1977–1980)
Tim McCarver (1983–1989)
Al Michaels (1976–1989)
Joe Morgan (1988–1989)
Jim Palmer (1978–1989)
Bob Prince (1976)
Steve Stone (1982–1983)
Bob Uecker (1976–1982)
Earl Weaver (1982–1984)
Bill White (1977–1978)
Warner Wolf (1976–1977)

1989 (Thursday Night Baseball)
Tim McCarver (1983–1989)
Al Michaels (1976–1989)
Joe Morgan (1988–1989)
Jim Palmer (1978–1989)
Gary Thorne (1989)

2020–present (ESPN productions)

2020 MLB Wild Card Series 
Game 1: Houston Astros vs. Minnesota Twins (9/29)
Karl Ravech
Eduardo Pérez
Tim Kurkjian

Games 1 and 2: Miami Marlins vs. Chicago Cubs (9/30, 10/2)
Jon Sciambi
Chipper Jones
Jesse Rogers

2021 Sunday Night Baseball
Chicago White Sox vs. Chicago Cubs (8/8)
Matt Vasgersian
Alex Rodriguez
Buster Olney

2022 MLB Wild Card Series
Game 1: Philadelphia Phillies vs. St. Louis Cardinals (10/7)
Michael Kay
Alex Rodriguez
Alden Gonzalez

Other ABC Major League Baseball announcers
Jim Kaat
Reggie Jackson
Note: During the spare time of his active career, Reggie Jackson worked as a field reporter and color commentator for ABC Sports. During the 1980s (1983, 1985, and 1987 respectively), Jackson was given the task of presiding over the World Series Trophy presentations. 
Tommy Lasorda
Billy Martin
Brent Musburger
Tom Seaver
Lesley Visser

See also
 List of current Major League Baseball announcers
 List of MLB on ESPN broadcasters
 The Baseball Network announcers

References

External links
Searchable Network TV Broadcasts

ABC
Major League Baseball on ABC announcers